Girdhar Pratap Singh Rana was the ruler of Gohad Jat state in Madhya Pradesh, India. He became the ruler of Gohad after the fall of Bhim Singh Rana. Rana Bhim Singh had no son.  Girdhar Pratap Singh became his successor in 1755. Girdhar Pratap Singh was son of Samant Rao Balju, a family friend of Rana Bhim Singh. Girdhar Pratap Singh could not rule Gohad for long as he died in 1757. His successor was Rana Chhatar Singh (1757–1785). He was from Bamraulia gotra of Jats. He ruled Gohad state until 1757.

References
Dr. Ajay Kumar Agnihotri (1985) : Gohad ke jaton ka Itihas(Hindi), Nav sahitya Bhawan, New Delhi.
Dr. Natthan Singh (2004) : Jat-Itihas, Jat Samaj Kalyan Parishad, Gwalior.
 Balwantrao Bhaiya Saheb Sindhia: History of Gwalior Fort
Jat Veer Smarika 2005, Jat Samaj Kalyan Parishad Gwalior
Jat Samaj, Agra: October–November 2004
 Dr. Natthan Singh (2005): Sujas Prabandh (Gohad ke Shasakon ki Veer gatha – by Poet Nathan), Jat Veer Prakashan Gwalior

1757 deaths
History of Madhya Pradesh
Jat rulers
Hindu monarchs
People from Bhind
Year of birth unknown